The Communauté de communes de l'Ouest d'Amiens  is a former communauté de communes in the Somme département and in the  Picardy région of France. It was merged into the new Communauté de communes Nièvre et Somme in January 2017.

Composition 
This Communauté de communes included 18 communes:
Ailly-sur-Somme
Argœuves
Belloy-sur-Somme
Bourdon
Breilly
Cavillon
Crouy-Saint-Pierre
Ferrières
Fourdrinoy
Hangest-sur-Somme
La Chaussée-Tirancourt
Le Mesge
Picquigny
Saint-Sauveur
Saisseval
Seux
Soues
Yzeux

References

See also
Communes of the Somme department

Ouest d'Amiens